Herev Le'et (lit. Sword to Plowshare) is a moshav in central Israel. Located in the coastal plain to the south of Hadera and covering 1,750 dunams, it falls under the jurisdiction of Hefer Valley Regional Council.

History
The moshav was founded in 1947 by demobilised soldiers from the British and Czechoslovak Army. Its name is taken from the Book of Isaiah, 2:4;
And He shall judge between the nations, and shall decide for many peoples; and they shall beat their swords into plowshares, and their spears into pruninghooks; nation shall not lift up sword against nation, neither shall they learn war any more.

References

Moshavim
Agricultural Union
Populated places established in 1947
1947 establishments in Mandatory Palestine
Populated places in Central District (Israel)
Czech-Jewish culture in Israel
Slovak-Jewish culture in Israel